Cathy's Last Resort is a 1988 animated television special based on the Cathy comic strip by Cathy Guisewite. It features Kathleen Wilhoite as the voice of Cathy Andrews, and was written by Guisewite, executive producer Lee Mendelson, produced by Bill Melendez, and directed by Evert Brown. This special premiered after the episode "The NASA Space Station" of This Is America, Charlie Brown.

Plot
Cathy's preparations for an idyllic, romantic vacation with her boyfriend, Irving, go awry.

Voices
 Kathleen Wilhoite as Cathy Andrews
 Robert F. Paulsen as Irving Hillman
 Emily Levine as Charlene
 Shirley Mitchell as Anne - Cathy's Mom
 William L. Guisewite as Bill - Cathy's Dad
 Frank Welker as Steve
 Allison Argo as Andrea
 Gregg Berger as Mr. Pinkley
 Heather Kerr as Airline Clerk
 Jamie E. Smith as Zenith (credited as Jamie Neal)

References

External links
 
 

1980s American television specials
1988 television specials
1988 in American television
1980s animated television specials
Television shows based on comic strips
CBS television specials
Hollywood, Los Angeles in fiction